Cozy Bear, classified by the United States federal government as advanced persistent threat APT29, is a Russian hacker group believed to be associated with one or more intelligence agencies of Russia. The Dutch General Intelligence and Security Service (AIVD) deduced from security camera footage that it is led by the Russian Foreign Intelligence Service (SVR); this view is shared by the United States. Cybersecurity firm CrowdStrike also previously suggested that it may be associated with either the Russian Federal Security Service (FSB) or SVR. The group has been given various nicknames by other cybersecurity firms, including CozyCar, CozyDuke (by F-Secure), Dark Halo, The Dukes (by Volexity), NOBELIUM, Office Monkeys, StellarParticle, UNC2452, and YTTRIUM.

On 20 December 2020, it was reported that Cozy Bear was responsible for a cyber attack on U.S. sovereign national data, believed to be at the direction of the Russian government.

Methods and technical capability

Kaspersky Lab determined that the earliest samples of the MiniDuke malware attributed to the group date from 2008. The original code was written in assembly language. Symantec believes that Cozy Bear had been compromising diplomatic organizations and governments since at least 2010.

The CozyDuke malware utilises a backdoor and a dropper. The malware exfiltrates data to a command and control server. Attackers may tailor the malware to the environment. The backdoor components of Cozy Bear's malware are updated over time with modifications to cryptography, trojan functionality, and anti-detection. The speed at which Cozy Bear develops and deploys its components is reminiscent of the toolset of Fancy Bear, which also uses the tools CHOPSTICK and CORESHELL.

Cozy Bear's CozyDuke malware toolset is structurally and functionally similar to second stage components used in early Miniduke, Cosmicduke, and OnionDuke operations. A second stage module of the CozyDuke malware, Show.dll, appears to have been built onto the same platform as OnionDuke, suggesting that the authors are working together or are the same people. The campaigns and the malware toolsets they use are referred to as the Dukes, including Cosmicduke, Cozyduke, and Miniduke. CozyDuke is connected to the MiniDuke and CosmicDuke campaigns, as well as to the OnionDuke cyberespionage campaign. Each threat group tracks their targets and use toolsets that were likely created and updated by Russian speakers. Following exposure of the MiniDuke in 2013, updates to the malware were written in C/C++ and it was packed with a new obfuscator.

Cozy Bear is suspected of being behind the 'HAMMERTOSS' remote access tool which uses commonly visited websites like Twitter and GitHub to relay command data.

Seaduke is a highly configurable, low-profile Trojan only used for a small set of high-value targets. Typically, Seaduke is installed on systems already infected with the much more widely distributed CozyDuke.

Attacks
Cozy Bear appears to have different projects, with different user groups. The focus of its project "Nemesis Gemina" is military, government, energy, diplomatic and telecom sectors. Evidence suggests that Cozy Bear's targets have included commercial entities and government organizations in Germany, Uzbekistan, South Korea and the US, including the US State Department and the White House in 2014.

Office Monkeys (2014)
In March 2014, a Washington, D.C.-based private research institute was found to have CozyDuke (Trojan.Cozer) on their network. Cozy Bear then started an email campaign attempting to lure victims into clicking on a flash video of office monkeys that would also include malicious executables. By July the group had compromised government networks and directed CozyDuke-infected systems to install Miniduke onto a compromised network.

In the summer of 2014, digital agents of the Dutch General Intelligence and Security Service infiltrated Cozy Bear. They found that these Russian hackers were targeting the US Democratic Party, State Department and White House. Their evidence influenced the FBI's decision to open an investigation.

Pentagon (August 2015)
In August 2015, Cozy Bear was linked to a spear-phishing cyber-attack against the Pentagon email system, causing the shut down of the entire Joint Staff unclassified email system and Internet access during the investigation.

Democratic National Committee (2016)

In June 2016, Cozy Bear was implicated alongside the hacker group Fancy Bear in the Democratic National Committee cyber attacks. While the two groups were both present in the Democratic National Committee's servers at the same time, they appeared to be unaware of the other, each independently stealing the same passwords and otherwise duplicating their efforts. A CrowdStrike forensic team determined that while Cozy Bear had been on the DNC's network for over a year, Fancy Bear had only been there a few weeks. Cozy Bear's more sophisticated tradecraft and interest in traditional long-term espionage suggest that the group originates from a separate Russian intelligence agency.

US think tanks and NGOs (2016)
After the 2016 United States presidential election, Cozy Bear was linked to a series of coordinated and well-planned spear phishing campaigns against U.S.-based think tanks and non-governmental organizations (NGOs).

Norwegian government (2017)
On February 3, 2017, the Norwegian Police Security Service (PST) reported that attempts had been made to spearphish the email accounts of nine individuals in the Ministry of Defence, Ministry of Foreign Affairs, and the Labour Party. The acts were attributed to Cozy Bear, whose targets included the Norwegian Radiation Protection Authority, PST section chief Arne Christian Haugstøyl, and an unnamed colleague. Prime Minister Erna Solberg called the acts "a serious attack on our democratic institutions." The attacks were reportedly conducted in January 2017.

Dutch ministries (2017)
In February 2017, it was revealed that Cozy Bear and Fancy Bear had made several attempts to hack into Dutch ministries, including the Ministry of General Affairs, over the previous six months. Rob Bertholee, head of the AIVD, said on EenVandaag that the hackers were Russian and had tried to gain access to secret government documents.

In a briefing to parliament, Dutch Minister of the Interior and Kingdom Relations Ronald Plasterk announced that votes for the Dutch general election in March 2017 would be counted by hand.

Operation Ghost
Suspicions that Cozy Bear had ceased operations were dispelled in 2019 by the discovery of three new malware families attributed to Cozy Bear: PolyglotDuke, RegDuke and FatDuke. This shows that Cozy Bear did not cease operations, but rather had developed new tools that were harder to detect. Target compromises using these newly uncovered packages are collectively referred to as Operation Ghost.

COVID-19 vaccine data (2020)
In July 2020 Cozy Bear was accused by the NSA, NCSC and the CSE of trying to steal data on vaccines and treatments for COVID-19 being developed in the UK, US, and Canada.

SUNBURST malware supply chain attack (2020)

On 8 December 2020, U.S. cybersecurity firm FireEye disclosed that a collection of their proprietary cybersecurity research tools had been stolen, possibly by "a nation with top-tier offensive capabilities."  On 13 December 2020, FireEye announced that investigations into the circumstances of that intellectual property theft revealed "a global intrusion campaign ... [utilizing a] supply chain attack trojanizing SolarWinds Orion business software updates in order to distribute malware we call SUNBURST.... This campaign may have begun as early as Spring 2020 and... is the work of a highly skilled actor [utilizing] significant operational security."

Shortly thereafter, SolarWinds confirmed that multiple versions of their Orion platform products had been compromised, probably by a foreign nation state. The impact of the attack prompted the U.S. Cybersecurity and Infrastructure Security Agency (CISA) to issue a rare emergency directive. Approximately 18,000 SolarWinds clients were exposed to SUNBURST, including several U.S. federal agencies. Washington Post sources identified Cozy Bear as the group responsible for the attack.

According to Microsoft, the hackers then stole signing certificates that allowed them to impersonate any of a target’s existing users and accounts through the Security Assertion Markup Language. Typically abbreviated as SAML, the XML-based language provides a way for identity providers to exchange authentication and authorization data with service providers.

Republican National Committee (2021)
In July 2021, Cozy Bear breached systems of the Republican National Committee. Officials said they believed the attack to have been conducted through Synnex. The cyberattack came amid larger fallout over the ransomware attack spread through compromised Kaseya VSA software.

Unknown Microsoft customer (2022)
On August 24th, 2022, Microsoft revealed a customer was compromised by a Cozy Bear attack that had very high resilience on an Active Directory Federated Services server and dubbed this attack method "MagicWeb", an attack which "manipulates the user authentication certificates used for authentication".

See also
2016 United States election interference by Russia
The Plot to Hack America

References

External link
Russian government employees charged in hacking campaigns

Russian advanced persistent threat groups
Cybercrime
Cyberwarfare
Hacker groups
Hacking in the 2000s
Hacking in the 2010s
Information technology in Russia
Military units and formations established in the 2000s
Organizations associated with Russian interference in the 2016 United States elections